Sultan Agung Mataram 1628 is a 2018 Indonesian historical film directed by Hanung Bramantyo.

The film is about Sultan Agung Hanyakrakusuma (1593–1646), third king of the Mataram Sultanate,  who reigned between 1613 and 1646.

Production
Zainal researched for four years from 2007 until 2011 to create the film. The research took place in Leiden University, Amsterdam Museum, Batav people (Dutch ethnic), remains of Mataram in Kota Gede, Yogya Palace, Solo/Kartasura Palace, Imogiri Kings Cemetery, as well as discussion with historians, historical hills, Jakarta Old City and Sunda Kelapa Port, as well as the remains of VOC castle.

References

2018 films
Indonesian drama films
Sultan Agung
2010s historical films